Life support, or aircrew life support, in aviation, is the field centered on, and related technologies used in, ensuring the safety of aircrew, particularly military aviation. This includes safety equipment capable of helping them survive in the case of a crash, accident, or malfunction.

Life support functions and technology are also prominent in the field of human spaceflight.

Military aviation